Geydar may refer to:

Qidar, city in Iran
 Geydar Dzhemal (1947–2016), Islamic revolutionary

See also
 
 Gaidar
 Gaydar
 Heydar
 Haydar